János Kulka may refer to:

 János Kulka (conductor)
 János Kulka (actor)